Mount Olive, Arkansas may refer to any one of many locations in the U.S. state of Arkansas:

 Mount Olive, Ashley County, Arkansas
 Mount Olive, Bradley County, Arkansas
 Mount Olive, Conway County, Arkansas
 Mount Olive, Howard County, Arkansas
 Mount Olive, Izard County, Arkansas
 Mount Olive, Poinsett County, Arkansas
 Mount Olive, Washington County, Arkansas